Monroe K. Spears (1916 - May 23, 1998) was an American university professor and literary critic. He was the editor of the Sewanee Review from 1952 to 1961, and the Libbie Shearn Moody Professor of English at Rice University from 1964 to 1986. He was the author of several books about American and British poetry.

Early life
Spears was born in 1916 in Darlington, South Carolina. He graduated from the University of South Carolina, where he earned a bachelor's degree, and he earned a master's degree followed by a PhD from Princeton University.

Career
Spears began his career as an English professor at the University of Wisconsin, followed by Vanderbilt University. He joined the faculty at Sewanee: The University of the South, where he was the editor of the Sewanee Review from 1952 to 1961. He was the Libbie Shearn Moody Professor of English at Rice University from 1964 to 1986.

Spears was the author of several books about American and British poetry and poets, including W. H. Auden and Matthew Prior. He was also a contributor to The New York Review of Books. He was a member of the Fellowship of Southern Writers.

Personal life, death and legacy
Spears lived in Sewanee, Tennessee with his wife, Betty. He died on May 23, 1998, in Winchester, Tennessee. He is the namesake of the annual Monroe K. Spears Award at Rice University.

Works

References

1916 births
1998 deaths
People from Darlington, South Carolina
University of South Carolina alumni
Princeton University alumni
University of Wisconsin–Madison faculty
Vanderbilt University faculty
Sewanee: The University of the South faculty
Rice University faculty
American male poets
American magazine editors
American literary critics
American male non-fiction writers
20th-century American male writers